Pierre Hamel (born September 16, 1952) is a Canadian former professional ice hockey goaltender who played 69 games in the National Hockey League. He played for the Toronto Maple Leafs and Winnipeg Jets between 1974 and 1981.

Career statistics

Regular season and playoffs

External links

1952 births
Living people
Canadian expatriate ice hockey players in Germany
Canadian expatriate ice hockey players in the United States
Canadian ice hockey goaltenders
Carolina Thunderbirds players
Drummondville Rangers players
Düsseldorfer EG players
Fredericton Express players
French Quebecers
Ice hockey people from Montreal
Laval National players
New Brunswick Hawks players
Sherbrooke Jets players
Toronto Maple Leafs players
Tulsa Oilers (1964–1984) players
Undrafted National Hockey League players
Winnipeg Jets (1979–1996) players
Verdun Maple Leafs (ice hockey) players